Daks(h)ini or Daxini may refer to:
 Dakṣiṇī, a southern variety of Classical Sanskrit
 Daxini, a neighbourhood in Ahmedabad, India
 Dakshinee, a music academy in Kolkata, India
 Manali Dakshini (born 1997), Indian cricketer

See also 
 Dakshina
 Dakhini, an Indo-Aryan language of South India related to Urdu